William Benson Thomas (born July 1, 1986) is an American-Georgian professional basketball player who plays for Unicaja of the Liga ACB. He is former college basketball player for George Mason University. He also holds a Georgian passport.

College career
As a starter in his sophomore year, Thomas was part of the 2005-06 George Mason Final Four team.  During his college career, Thomas was named to the Colonial Athletic Association's All-CAA second team in 2007 and first team in 2008.  He was named to the CAA All-Defensive Team for the three straight seasons.  In his senior season, he was the runner-up for both the CAA Player of the Year and CAA Defensive Player of the Year.

Professional career
After graduating from George Mason University in the spring of 2008, Thomas was picked to be part of the Washington Wizards summer league roster.  He was cut from the team and shortly after signed with Belgacom Liege of the Belgian League. He signed a contract with BC Oostende after playing with Belgacom Liege for 2 years.

For the 2011-12 season, he signed a contract with BC Armia from Georgia. He helped them win the Georgian Cup.

In July 2012, he signed a contract with Pınar Karşıyaka of the Turkish Basketball League. On August 26, 2013, he signed a contract with an Italian league basketball team, Sidigas Avellino.

On July 22, 2014, Thomas signed a one-year deal with the Spanish team Unicaja. In his first EuroLeague season, he averaged 6.9 points and 4.5 rebounds over 24 games played.

On July 14, 2016, he signed a two-year deal with Spanish club Valencia Basket. On July 27, 2018, he signed a one-year contract extension with Valencia Basket, until the end of the 2018–19 season.

On August 7, 2019, Thomas signed with Russian club Zenit Saint Petersburg of the VTB United League and the EuroLeague.

On July 14, 2021, he signed with BC UNICS of the VTB United League. On September 2, 2021, his contract was terminated. Thomas signed with AS Monaco Basket of the LNB Pro A on September 11.

On July 15, 2022, he signed with Unicaja of the Liga ACB.

Records
Thomas is George Mason University's eighth all-time point scorer with 1,564, the third all-time rebounder in men's basketball history with 993 rebounds and has the most games played in team history with 131.

Career statistics

EuroLeague

|-
| style="text-align:left;"| 2014–15
| style="text-align:left;" rowspan=2| Unicaja
| 24 || 14 || 20.6 || .511 || .286 || .727 || 4.5 || .9 || .3 || .1 || 6.9 || 9.1
|-
| style="text-align:left;"| 2015–16
| 24 || 15 || 23.0 || .532 || .212 || .833 || 4.6 || 1.2 || .6 || .1 || 8.1 || 10.1
|-
| style="text-align:left;"| 2017–18
| style="text-align:left;"| Valencia Basket
| 30 || 23 || 23.6 || .473 || .288 || .744 || 3.6 || 1.1 || .8|| .1 || 6.2 || 8.1
|-
| style="text-align:left;"| 2019–20
| style="text-align:left;" rowspan=2| Zenit
| 27 || 21 || 27.5 || .605 || .342 || .759 || 3.9 || 1.4 || 1.0 || .1 || 10.3 || 13.1
|-
| style="text-align:left;"| 2020–21
| 39 || 39 || 26.2 || .603 || .419 || .897 || 4.9 || 1.4 || .7 || .2 || 9.3 || 13.4

References

External links
 Will Thomas at acb.com 
 Will Thomas at draftexpress.com
 Will Thomas at eurobasket.com
 Will Thomas at euroleague.net
 Will Thomas at tblstat.net

1986 births
Living people
American expatriate basketball people in Belgium
American expatriate basketball people in Georgia (country)
American expatriate basketball people in Italy
American expatriate basketball people in Russia
American expatriate basketball people in Spain
American expatriate basketball people in Turkey
American men's basketball players
AS Monaco Basket players
Basketball players from Baltimore
BC Oostende players
BC Zenit Saint Petersburg players
Baloncesto Málaga players
George Mason Patriots men's basketball players
Karşıyaka basketball players
Liège Basket players
Liga ACB players
Men's basketball players from Georgia (country)
Power forwards (basketball)
S.S. Felice Scandone players
Valencia Basket players